Mampuram is a Muslim pilgrimage centre located 26 km east of Tirur, Malappuram district, Kerala, South India on the Malabar Coast.  Malappuram is on the banks of the river Kadalundipuzha.  The Mamburam Makham, which is the shrine intended and used primarily as a receptacle for the dead bodies of the principle Thangals is located there.  The Malappuram Nercha, is held every year in the month of Muharram near the tomb of Sayyid Alavi Thangal.

History 
Mampuram was an active center  of the Khilafath movement as well as the national movement.  The Thirurangadi Juma Masjid, from where the local khilafath leader Ali Musliyar operated, is situated in Mampuram.

Image gallery

See also 
 Mappila
 Thangal
 Sayid Fasal Pookoya Thangal
 Kondotty
 Murder of Collector Connolly

References

External links 

 www.tirurangadi.net

Villages in Malappuram district
Islam in Kerala
Parappanangadi area